Isabella Teotochi Albrizzi (Greek: Ελισάβετ Θεοτόκη, Corfu, 1760 - Venice, 27 September 1836) was a Greek - Venetian writer, salonist and countess.

Life 
Born in 1760 in Corfu, she was a member of the prominent Theotokis family. In 1776 she married the Venetian patrician Carlo Antonio Marin but they divorced after a couple of years. Meanwhile, Theotoki moved to Venice where she completed her studies and gained the reputation of a well-educated woman. In 1796 she was married again, this time to the state inquisitor Giuseppe Albrizzi.

Isabella Albrizzi was the host of a salon which was the literary and artistically center of contemporary Venice. Among her friends and guests were Ugo Foscolo, Antonio Canova, Lord Byron and Ippolito Pindemonte. In 1807 she published her work  Ritratti.

She died in Venice, on 27 September 1836. She had two sons, Giovan Battista Marin and Giovanni Battista Giuseppe Albrizzi.

References

Bibliography 
 
 Svensk uppslagsbok. Lund 1929

1760 births
1836 deaths
Writers from Corfu
18th-century Italian women writers
Italian salon-holders
18th-century Greek people
Venetian Greeks
Republic of Venice entertainers
18th-century Greek women
19th-century Italian women writers
18th-century Venetian women
Republic of Venice women writers
Theotokis family